Antti Kangasniemi (born June 6, 1985) is a Finnish ice hockey player who currently plays professionally in Finland for Tappara of the SM-liiga.

References

External links

Living people
Tappara players
1985 births
Finnish ice hockey centres
Ice hockey people from Tampere